Ramkumar Ramanathan was the defending champion but chose not to defend his title.

Thanasi Kokkinakis won the title after defeating Abedallah Shelbayh 6–1, 6–4 in the final. Shelbayh became the first Jordanian player to reach a final on the Challenger tour.

Seeds

Draw

Finals

Top half

Bottom half

References

External links
Main draw
Qualifying draw

Bahrain Ministry of Interior Tennis Challenger - 1